In Greek mythology, Phaethusa or Phaëthusa  ( Phaéthousa, "radiance") was a daughter of Helios and Neaera, the personification of the brilliant, blinding rays of the sun. With her twin sister, Lampetia, she guarded the cattle of Thrinacia. She carried a copper staff with which she tended to her father's herd of sheep. She is sometimes listed as among the Heliades, daughters of Helios and Clymene who mourned for their brother Phaethon and were transformed into poplar trees. In the Argonautica however, set explicitly after Phaethon's death, she and her sister are still tending to their father's flock.

Namesake
296 Phaëtusa

References

Greek goddesses
Children of Helios
Personifications in Greek mythology
Metamorphoses into trees in Greek mythology